HMAS Barwon (K406) was a  that served the Royal Australian Navy (RAN) from 1945 to 1947. She was named for the Barwon River in Victoria and was one of eight River-class frigates built for the RAN during World War II.

Construction
HMAS Barwon was one of eight River-class frigates built for the RAN during World War II. She was laid down on 31 May 1943 at Cockatoo Docks & Engineering Company, Sydney, launched on 3 August 1944 and commissioned on 10 December 1945.

Operational history
Following a period of training Barwon departed Sydney on an operational patrol on 14 February 1946. She visited Darwin before sailing to the Philippines. After a period in Filipino waters she returned to Darwin where she was used to dump ammunition at sea and inspect coastal navigation lights. She also transported members of a war crimes tribunal to Koepang in Timor. She returned to Sydney by 1 July 1946 and underwent a refit from that date until 29 August.

Once the refit was complete Barwon sailed to New Guinea where she was again used to inspect and repair coastal lights and dump ammunition. She arrived in Melbourne on 20 January 1947 and was taken out of commission. She subsequently paid off to reserve on 31 March 1947. In April that year she was fitted with two Squid anti-submarine mortars.

Barwon was not reactivated after entering reserve and was sold for scrapping in January 1962.

Notes

References

External links

River-class frigates of the Royal Australian Navy
Ships built in New South Wales
1944 ships